John Dixon Paragon (December 9, 1954 – April 3, 2021) was an American actor, writer and director known for his work on the television series Pee-wee's Playhouse, where he portrayed Jambi the Genie and voiced Pterri the Pterodactyl. He was also a writer and director on a number of episodes.

Early life
Paragon was born on December 9, 1954 in Anchorage, Alaska, but grew up and attended schools in Fort Collins, Colorado. He graduated from Fort Collins High School.

Career
Paragon got his start in the Los Angeles-based improvisation group The Groundlings alongside Paul Reubens and Phil Hartman.

He played Jambi the Genie on the children's TV show Pee-wee's Playhouse. In addition to writing many of its regular-season episodes, he co-wrote (with Reubens) the Pee-wee's Playhouse Christmas Special in 1988, for which they were nominated for an Emmy Award for Best Writing in a Children's Special.

His other roles include Cedric, one half of the couple Bob and Cedric on the television series Seinfeld; the title character in the children's movie The Frog Prince; the sex shop salesman in Eating Raoul; and the owner of a strip-o-gram business in the 1986 film Echo Park.

He collaborated with fellow Groundling Cassandra Peterson on numerous Elvira projects, including the recurring role of The Breather, an annoying caller, for her first television series on KHJ-TV-Los Angeles.

He also made multiple appearances at Knott's Scary Farm with Elvira at the Good Time Theater. One of the show's highlights was when he walked amongst the audience as Ramone Azteca.

Paragon worked with Walt Disney Imagineering on ways to incorporate improvisational performance into attractions at Disney parks. In this capacity, he performed as the keeper of Lucky the Dinosaur during test runs of the animatronic figure.

He returned to his performance as Jambi the Genie in the Broadway outing of the Pee-wee Herman stage show that began performances at the Stephen Sondheim Theater on October 26, 2010.

Death
Paragon died on April 3, 2021 at his home in Palm Springs, California, at the age of 66. His cause of death was heart disease and chronic alcoholism. News of his death was not made public until June 18 of that year. He was cremated and his ashes were in the possession of Cassandra Peterson until they were interred at the Hollywood Forever Cemetery on November 15, 2022. His urn is "a perfectly crafted depiction" of the purple-and-gold Jambi the Genie box.

Filmography

Films 

Also production consultant direct-to-video ThrillerVideo (1985).

Television

References

External links
 
 

1954 births
2021 deaths
21st-century American male writers
21st-century American comedians
21st-century American screenwriters
American male comedians
American male screenwriters
American male television actors
American male television writers
American television directors
American television writers
Male actors from Anchorage, Alaska
Male actors from Colorado
Screenwriters from Alaska